Propebela nobilis is a species of sea snail, a marine gastropod mollusk in the family Mangeliidae.

Description
The shell resembles that of Propebela rugulata. The spire, as a rule, is shorter than the aperture. The axial ribs are strongly projectant, and between them, round the angulated ultimate part of the whorl, a deepish concavity occurs, in which the transversal sculpture distinctly appears.

Distribution

References

 Bogdanov, I. P. Mollusks of Oenopotinae subfamily (Gastropoda, Pectinibranchia, Turridae) in the seas of the USSR. Nauka, 1990.
 Brunel, P.; Bosse, L.; Lamarche, G. (1998). Catalogue of the marine invertebrates of the estuary and Gulf of St. Lawrence. Canadian Special Publication of Fisheries and Aquatic Sciences, 126. 405 p.
 Gofas, S.; Le Renard, J.; Bouchet, P. (2001). Mollusca. in: Costello, M.J. et al. (eds), European Register of Marine Species: a check-list of the marine species in Europe and a bibliography of guides to their identification. Patrimoines Naturels. 50: 180–213

External links

  Möller, Hans Peter Christian. Index molluscorum groenlandiæ. CA Reitzell, 1842 
 Trott, T. J. (2004). Cobscook Bay inventory: a historical checklist of marine invertebrates spanning 162 years. Northeastern Naturalist. 11, 261–324
 
 
 Nekhaev, Ivan O. "Marine shell-bearing Gastropoda of Murman (Barents Sea): an annotated check-list." Ruthenica 24.2 (2014): 75
 Malacolog.com: Propebela nobilis

nobilis
Gastropods described in 1842